Lažani is a village located in a lowland area in the municipality of Dolneni, North Macedonia.

Demographics
Lažani traditionally was inhabited by a Macedonian Muslim (Torbeš) population that speaks the Macedonian language. During the 1960s, Slavic Muslims from Sandžak, known as Sandžakli settling in Debrešte were not well received by the local population which forced them to move to neighboring villages, mainly to Lažani where their numbers are high. Muslim Albanians from the sub-region of Pešter in Sandžak also settled in Lažani and number 30 households with some families bearing the surname Shkreli. The village in the 21st century has a mixed population consisting of Macedonian Muslims (Torbeš), Orthodox Macedonians, Bosniaks and Muslim Albanians containing 300 households amidst a population of around 2000 people. Intermarriage between Muslim Albanians and Bosniaks occurs in the village. Macedonian Muslims from Lažani refer to the surrounding Christian population as Makedonci (Macedonians) and those Orthodox Macedonians refer to them as Turci (Turks) due to they being Muslims. 

According to the 2021 census, the village had a total of 1.755 inhabitants. Ethnic groups in the village include:

Bosniaks 901
Turks 377
Macedonians 264
Albanians 153
Others 60

Sports
Local football club FK Sloga 1976 plays in the Macedonian Third League.

References

Villages in Dolneni Municipality
Macedonian Muslim villages
Albanian communities in North Macedonia